Heinrich von Tiedemann (1840-1922) was a Prussian politician, co-founder of the German Eastern Marches Society.

Tiedemann was born in Dembogorsch (Dębogórze, Poland), he died in Berlin.

References 

 Witold Jakóbczyk, Przetrwać na Wartą 1815-1914, Dzieje narodu i państwa polskiego, vol. III-55, Krajowa Agencja Wydawnicza, Warszawa 1989

German untitled nobility
People from the Province of Prussia
Prussian politicians
1840 births
1922 deaths